The following lists events that happened during 1984 in the Grand Duchy of Luxembourg.

Incumbents

Events

January – March
 8 February - American Vice President George H. W. Bush begins a two-day official visit to Luxembourg.
 24 February – Luxembourgish is declared to be the 'national language' of Luxembourg, and one of the three official languages, alongside French and German.

April – June
 5 May – Luxembourg City hosts the Eurovision Song Contest 1984 after Corinne Hermès's victory the previous year.  Representing Luxembourg, Sophie Carle finishes tenth with the song 100% d'amour.
 17 June – Legislative and European elections are held.  The LSAP increases its representation in the Chamber of Deputies by half.

July – September
 20 July – Pierre Werner resigns his position as Prime Minister to retire from politics.  Jacques Santer forms a new government, with Jacques Poos as his deputy.

October – December
 18 October - Luxembourger Marcel Mart becomes President of the European Court of Auditors.
 24 December - A law is passed creating a new system of automatically indexing wages and benefits to inflation.

Births
 3 June – Prince Félix of Luxembourg
 30 August – Jeff Henckels, archer
 3 September – David Fiegen, athlete

Deaths
 29 June – Victor Bodson, politician
 29 August – Camille Ney, politician

Footnotes

References